The list of by-elections in the United Kingdom is divided chronologically by parliament:

Parliament of the United Kingdom
List of United Kingdom by-elections (1801–1806)
List of United Kingdom by-elections (1806–1818)
List of United Kingdom by-elections (1818–1832)
List of United Kingdom by-elections (1832–1847)
List of United Kingdom by-elections (1847–1857)
List of United Kingdom by-elections (1857–1868)
List of United Kingdom by-elections (1868–1885)
List of United Kingdom by-elections (1885–1900)
List of United Kingdom by-elections (1900–1918)
List of United Kingdom by-elections (1918–1931)
List of United Kingdom by-elections (1931–1950)
List of United Kingdom by-elections (1950–1979)
List of United Kingdom by-elections (1979–2010)
List of United Kingdom by-elections (2010–present)
By-elections to the House of Lords (hereditary peers)

Parliament of Great Britain
List of Great Britain by-elections (1707–1715)
List of Great Britain by-elections (1715–1734)
List of Great Britain by-elections (1734–1754)
List of Great Britain by-elections (1754–1774)
List of Great Britain by-elections (1774–1790)
List of Great Britain by-elections (1790–1800)

Parliament of England
List of English by-elections (1689–1700)
List of English by-elections (1701–1707)

Other parliaments
List of by-elections to the Scottish Parliament
List of by-elections to the National Assembly for Wales
List of European Parliament by-elections in the United Kingdom
List of Northern Ireland Parliament by-elections (1921–1972)
Northern Ireland Assembly vacancies are filled by co-option

Local government
Local government by-election results are generally given on the page for the last election in that area, see :Category:Council elections in the United Kingdom

See also
United Kingdom by-election records
List of United Kingdom general elections
:Category:By-elections in British Overseas Territories